Kurshim, also Kurchum or Kurchim (Kürşım) is a selo and administrative center of Kurshim District of East Kazakhstan Region, Kazakhstan. Population:  

The Kurchum River flows past the town and  Lake Zaysan lies to the south. The town lies on the road between the villages of Altyn Kala to the north-west and Surulen to the east; this road connects with the M38 road in the southeast which leads to Jeminay across the Chinese border in Xinjiang. The town is served by a small airport, Kurchum Airport, and Antonov An-2 biplanes fly in and out of the airport. In late 1989 or early 1990 the town was affected by an earthquake which destroyed the Kurchum Hospital, amongst other buildings. The landscape around the town is dominated by estuarine plains.

References

Populated places in East Kazakhstan Region